Poto or POTO may refer to:

 The Phantom of the Opera, a 1910 novel by French writer Gaston Leroux
 "Planet of the Ood", the third episode of the fourth series of British science fiction television series Doctor Who
 Poto dialect of the Losengo language, spoken in the Democratic Republic of the Congo

People 
 Poto the Brave (fl. 1060), Bavarian count palatine
 Alicia Poto (born 1978), Australian basketball player
 Mike Poto (born 1981), Zambian football goalkeeper
 Poto Williams (born 1962), New Zealand member of Parliament
 Poto and Cabengo (born 1970), American twin girls who used an invented language, subjects of a 1980 documentary film

See also
 Potos, a genus of mammals known as kinkajou or honey bear
 Poto Poto, a 1994 puzzle arcade game
 Potto (disambiguation)